The River Brain is a tributary of the River Blackwater in Essex, England. It gives its name to the town of Braintree, although Braintree lies on a low ridge between the Brain and the River Blackwater. To the north of Braintree it is known as Pods Brook. The brook rises near the village of Bardfield Saling. Below Braintree the Brain joins the Blackwater in Whet Mead in Witham. In 2001, a "flood park" was planned to reduce the risk of overflow from the river.

References and external links

 Map and aerial photo sources for grid reference:
  — the source of the Pods Brook
  — confluence with the Blackwater

Brain, Essex